Chaudhry Muhammad Shehbaz Babar Gujjar (born 18 February 1973) is a Pakistani politician who has been a member of the National Assembly of Pakistan, since August 2018. Previously he was a member of the National Assembly from June 2013 to May 2018.

Early life
He was born on 18 February 1973.

Political career
He was elected to the National Assembly of Pakistan as a candidate of Pakistan Muslim League (N) (PML-N) from Constituency NA-79 (Faisalabad-V) in 2013 Pakistani general election. He received 118,516 votes and defeated Khalid Abdullah Ghazi, a candidate of Pakistan Tehreek-e-Insaf.

Before being appointed as the Parliamentary Secretary for Information and Broadcasting in 2017, he served as a member of National Assembly Standing Committee for commerce, textile and health.

He was re-elected to the National Assembly as a candidate of PML-N from Constituency NA-104 (Faisalabad-IV) in 2018 Pakistani general election.

References

Living people
1973 births
Pakistani MNAs 2013–2018
Pakistani MNAs 2018–2023
Pakistan Muslim League (N) MNAs
Politicians from Faisalabad